The Organization for Jewish Colonization in Russia, commonly known by its transliterated acronym of ICOR, was a Communist-sponsored mass organization in North America devoted to supporting the settlement of Jews in new collective settlements, firstly in the newly established Ukrainian Soviet Republic and Southern Russia (Stavropol Krai), and latterly in the Jewish socialist republic of Birobidzhan in the Soviet Union. The organization was founded in the United States in 1924 and soon spread to Canada.

In 1934 the original ICOR organization was supplemented by a new fundraising and solidarity organization, the American Committee for the Settlement of Jews in Birobidjan (Ambidjan). The two groups merged into a unified organization in 1946.

Organizational history

Establishment

The founding meeting was held in New York City in December 1924 and the initial mission of the organization was to raise money to fund Jewish collective farms in Crimea and to provide a humanitarian alternative for Jews facing anti-Semitism in Europe. ICOR was motivated by the situation of the Jews of Eastern Europe who had faced decades of pogroms and turmoil (including almost a decade of war) in the Pale of Settlement and constant threat of anti-Semitism in their countries of refuge in Central and Western Europe. Alternatively, the relative safety and welcome in the New World yielded what many saw as a trend towards the dissipation of Jewish culture, language, and "nationality". Originally, the committee worked in partnership with its American contributors and Soviet authorities in order to support the newly founded large Jewish collective farms in the former Pale of Settlement, notably Southern Ukraine and the Crimea. These "kolkhozes" (collective farms) attracted many former shtetl Jews from Ukraine and Belorussia who had previously fled to larger cities for safety, as well as those whose livelihoods had been disrupted in the requisitions and economic restructuring of the early period of Soviet consolidation.

When, in 1928, the Soviet Union abandoned the idea of Jewish settlement in Crimea and endorsed instead the eventual formation of a Jewish Autonomous Republic in the eastern USSR, ICOR followed suit.  ICOR worked closely with the Komzet, the Soviet agency facilitating Jewish settlement, and its partner, the OZET.

One of ICOR's initial patrons was Julius Rosenwald, president of Sears, Roebuck and Company who contributed more than $2 million to ICOR. Rosenwald and many other prominent and wealthy American Jews contributed to ICOR's efforts, and their contributions were supplemented by those of working and middle class readers of the Yiddish press in the United States that carried appeals for funding and support.

Expansion

The Canadian wing became a separate organization in 1935. The ICOR was active among first and second generation Yiddish-speaking Jewish immigrants and was intended as a rival to the Zionist movement and its agitation for a Jewish homeland in Palestine. In the 1930s the organization was also involved in protests against Nazi Germany and encouraged a boycott of German goods and also fundraised for the International Brigades fighting in the Spanish Civil War.

ICOR was associated with the Communist Party, USA and the Communist Party of Canada and generally followed the Comintern's party line.  The organization declined following the signing of the Molotov–Ribbentrop Pact.

Ambidjan

The American Committee for the Settlement of Jews in Birobidjan (Ambidjan) was established on February 27, 1934, at a meeting held in the Ritz-Carlton Hotel in New York City. The meeting was addressed by Lord Marley, Dudley Leigh Aman, a British Labour Party Member of Parliament and leading spokesman for the Birobidzhan project in the United Kingdom.

The chief American behind the establishment of the new organization was William W. Cohen, a banker and stockbroker who had been a Congressman from New York's 17th Congressional District from 1926 to 1928. Cohen saw the establishment of a Jewish Autonomous Region in the USSR as providing an important "haven for the salvage and rehabilitation of many thousands of Jews suffering in the infernos of central and eastern Europe" and supported the establishment of Ambidjan with his money, time, and effort.

Ambidjan began formal operations in September 1935 with the establishment of an office located at 285 Madison Avenue in New York City. Lord Marley was named honorary president with Cohen the president of the organization.

A key figure behind the scenes at Ambidjan was Jacob M. Budish, a member of the Communist Party USA and employee of Amtorg, the New York-based Soviet foreign trade office in the United States. Budish's close ties with Soviet Ambassador Alexander Troyanovsky and position in the Communist Party apparatus made him the ideal conduit for information to Ambidjan regarding developments in the Soviet Union. In the summer of 1935 Budish travelled to Birobidzhan to tour the region and conduct talks with government officials regarding the future role of Ambidjan.

Following Budish's 1935 talks, Soviet authorities gave Ambidjan permission to proceed with its efforts to subsidize the emigration of European Jews to Birobidzhan. Selection of settlers, primarily from Poland, Lithuania, Romania, and Germany, was to be made by Ambidjan in consultation with Soviet officials. Ambidjan would provide a grant of $350 per family selected to aid in the costs of relocation.

Ambidjan's efforts attracted a wide spectrum of Americans to membership in its ranks, including a substantial contingent from the middle and upper classes, some of whom were non-Jews. Dues in the organization cost $5.

In 1946 ICOR and Ambijan merged to form a unified organization.

Dissolution
The organization was unable to withstand the anti-Communism of the McCarthy era; moreover, the creation of Israel in 1948 greatly increased the attractiveness of Zionism as offering an alternative for "Jewish Colonization". The organization was dissolved in 1951.

See also
Society for Settling Toiling Jews on the Land (OZET)
Committee for the Settlement of Toiling Jews on the Land (KOMZET)
History of the Jews in Russia and the Soviet Union
Jews and Judaism in the Jewish Autonomous Oblast
Yevsektsiya
Territorialism
Jewish Colonization Association

Footnotes

Further reading

 S. Almazov, 10 Years of Biro-Bidjan. New York: ICOR, 1938.
 American Committee for the Settlement of Jews in Birobidjan, Birobidjan: The Jewish Autonomous Territory in the USSR. New York: American Committee for the Settlement of Jews in Birobidjan, 1936.
 Melech Epstein, The Jew and Communism: The Story of Early Communist Victories and Ultimate Defeats in the Jewish Community, USA, 1919-1941. New York: Trade Union Sponsoring Committee, 1959.
 Henry Frankel, The Jews in the Soviet Union and Birobidjan. New York: American Birobidjan Committee, 1946.
 Nora Levin, The Jews in the Soviet Union Since 1917: Paradox of Survival: Volume 1. New York: New York University Press, 1988.
 James N. Rosenberg, How the Back-to-the-Soil Movement Began: Two Years of Blazing the New Jewish "Covered Wagon" Trail Across the Russian Prairies. Philadelphia: United Jewish Campaign, 1925.
 Henry Felix Srebrnik, Dreams of Nationhood: American Jewish Communists and the Soviet Birobidzhan Project, 1924-1951. Boston: Academic Studies Press, 2010.
 Henry Srebrnik, "Leadership and Control Within an American Jewish Communist Front: The Case of the ICOR," Shofar, vol. 16, no. 3 (Spring 1998), pp. 103–117. In JSTOR
 Robert Weinberg, Stalin's Forgotten Zion: Birobidzhan and the Making of a Soviet Jewish Homeland: An Illustrated History, 1928-1996. Berkeley, CA: University of California Press, 1998.

External links
Red star over Birobidzhan: Canadian Jewish Communists and the "Jewish Autonomous Region" in the Soviet Union. BNET
 The Short History of the Jews of ICOR, a Jewish agricultural settlement named after ICOR, and their murder during World War II, at Yad Vashem website.

Canada–Soviet Union relations
Communism in Canada
Communism in the United States
Defunct Jewish organizations
Jewish Autonomous Oblast
Jewish Canadian history
Jewish clubs and societies
Jewish community organizations
Jewish organizations based in Canada
Jewish organizations based in the United States
Jewish political organizations
Jewish Ukrainian history
Jews and Judaism in Crimea
Jews and Judaism in the Soviet Union
Organizations established in 1924
Jewish settlement schemes in the Soviet Union
Secular Jewish culture in Canada
Secular Jewish culture in Europe
Secular Jewish culture in the United States
Soviet Union–United States relations
Stavropol Krai